Shenzhen Safari Park is a zoo in Shenzhen, China. It is located in near Xili Lake in Xili Subdistrict. and covers an area of 1.2 million square meters. It is the first zoo in China to have uncaged animals. There are over 300 species and more than ten thousand animals in the zoo, including endangered ones such as Giant Pandas and South China tigers.

History
The zoo first opened on September 28, 1993. Since 2004, the zoo's black swans have been engaged in a commensal relationship with the koi found in the zoo's waters. The swans had originally begun dipping their food pellets into the water to moisten the texture, and as a result, the koi learned to swim up to the swans and eat the pellets.

On May 1, 2014, a lioness in the park gave birth to three cubs and neglected to care for them. Park workers had begun bottle-feeding the cubs in order to keep them nourished. A local pet store sent a Golden Retriever to care for the cubs, and the dog was accepted by the cubs as their surrogate mother on May 16.

Controversy
On October 2, 2014, a horse that was pulling tourists in a heavy carriage in the zoo, for the twelfth time that day, collapsed and died. The tourists, as well as some of the zoo's security guards, concluded that the horse's death was a result of overworking and malnourishment.

Gallery

See also
List of parks in Shenzhen

References

External links

 Shenzhen Safari Park 

Nanshan District, Shenzhen
Safari parks
Parks in Shenzhen
Zoos established in 1993
1993 establishments in China